= Sebastià Jovani =

Spanish writer

Sebastià Jovani is a Spanish novelist, poet and essayist. He made his debut in 2006 with the essay Los Libros del Diablo (Llibres de l'Índex / Ediciones de la Tempestad), following up with the novels Emulsió de Ferro (La Magrana, 2009, winner of the Premio Brigada 21) and Emet o la revolta (La Magrana, 2011). The latter has been translated from Catalan to Spanish by Duomo Ediciones.

Jovani's work has appeared in numerous anthologies of poetry and short fiction. He has also been translated into English by Granta magazine. His most recent novel is called Transnistria.
